Anthardaaham (മലയാളം: അന്തർദാഹം(ചലച്ചിത്രം)) is a 1977 Indian Malayalam film,  directed by I. V. Sasi. The film stars Sridevi, Sripriya, Bahadoor, K. P. Ummer and M. G. Soman in the lead roles. The film has musical score by M. K. Arjunan.

Cast
Sridevi
Sripriya
Bahadoor
K. P. Ummer
M. G. Soman
Vincent
 Sreekala (Rathidevi)

Soundtrack
The music was composed by M. K. Arjunan and the lyrics were written by Sreekumaran Thampi.

References

External links
 

1977 films
1970s Malayalam-language films
Films directed by I. V. Sasi